Kanuru Lakshmana Rao (15 July 1902 – 18 May 1986) was an Indian Civil  engineer and a Padma Bhushan awardee who served as the Union Minister of Irrigation & Power and Member of Parliament for Vijayawada from 1962 to 1977.

Personal life and education 

Rao was born in a Telugu Niyogi brahmin family in Kankipadu, Krishna district, Andhra Pradesh. His father was a village attorney. He lost his father when he was nine years old. He lost vision in one eye due to injury during childhood days while playing at school. He studied Intermediate (+2) at Presidency College, Madras. He took his B.E. degree in Civil Engineering from College of Engineering, Guindy and he was the first student from College of Engineering, Guindy to obtain a master's degree in engineering. Later he took his PhD in 1939 from the University of Birmingham in the United Kingdom.

Honours 

In 1963, Rao was awarded the Padma Bhushan for his contribution in the spheres of irrigation and power. He had been president of the Central Board of Irrigation and Power and of the All India Engineers Association in 1958–59 and 1959–1960. He was vice-president of International Society for Soil Mechanics and Geotechnical Engineering (Asia) in 1957–61 and in 1961–65. He was awarded a doctorate in science by Andhra University in 1960. He was also awarded a doctorate by Roorkee University in engineering in 1968.

Engineering career 

He worked as a professor in Rangoon, Burma. After completing his PhD he worked as assistant professor in the United Kingdom. He wrote a book called Structural Engineering and Reinforced Concrete. After returning to India, he worked as a design engineer for the Madras government. He held the post of director (designs) in Vidyut Commission-New Delhi in 1950. He was promoted as chief engineer in 1954.

He wrote autobiography titled The Cusecs Candidate.

Political career 

He was elected as a member of parliament from Vijayawada constituency for the first time in 1961. He was elected as member of parliament three times from the Vijayawada constituency. On 20 July 1963, Rao was sworn in as a minister for Irrigation and Electricity in the union government. Under his regime as union minister for water resources, Rao designed many irrigation and hydro-electric projects. Nagarjuna Sagar Dam, the world's longest masonry dam on River Krishna in Guntur district of Andhra Pradesh and Nalgonda District of Telangana, also the Srisailam Dam i.e constructed across the Krishna River on the border of Mahabubnagar(presently Jogulamba Gadwal) District, Telangana and Kurnool district, Andhra Pradesh near Srisailam temple town and is the 2nd largest capacity working hydroelectric station in the country is to his credit. Rao worked as union minister in Jawahar Lal Nehru, Lal Bahadur Shastri and Indira Gandhi's cabinet.

Recognition 
In 2006, the Pulichintala project, at Bellamkonda of Guntur district, has been named as K. L. Rao Sagar project.

See also 
 Arthur Cotton
 Vishveshwaraiah
 K. Sriramakrishnaiah

References 

 at The Hindu Wednesday, 16 Apr 2003

1902 births
Recipients of the Padma Bhushan in civil service
Indian National Congress politicians from Andhra Pradesh
India MPs 1962–1967
India MPs 1967–1970
India MPs 1971–1977
1986 deaths
Telugu politicians
Lok Sabha members from Andhra Pradesh
Engineers from Andhra Pradesh
Alumni of the University of Birmingham
People from Krishna district
20th-century Indian engineers